Adriana Janet Mercedes Cancino Meneses (born 22 June 1962) is a Chilean teacher who was elected as a member of the Chilean Constitutional Convention.

References

External links
 BCN Profile

Living people
1964 births
21st-century Chilean politicians
Members of the Chilean Constitutional Convention
21st-century Chilean women politicians